The 27th Rifle Division was a tactical unit in the Red Army of Soviet Russia and then the Soviet Union, active between 1918 and 1945. First formed during the Russian Civil War on November 3, 1918, as part of 5th Red Army. Commanded by Vitovt Putna, it was transferred to the 16th Red Army in 1920, and took part in the Polish–Soviet War. Defeated in the battles of Radzymin and Ossów (collectively known as the Battle of Warsaw), it practically ceased to exist.

Reformed in Russia, it returned to Poland in 1939 and took part in the Soviet invasion of Poland as part of the 3rd Army's 4th Rifle Corps, reaching Parafianów and the line of Serwecz River on September 18, 1939. It was then stationed in Soviet-occupied Poland with its headquarters in Suchowola and regiments stationed in Augustów, Grajewo and Suchowola. By 2 October 1939, the division had been subordinated to the 16th Rifle Corps of the 11th Army.

On 22 June 1941, the division was again part of 4th Rifle Corps, 3rd Army (Soviet Union), itself part of the Western Special Military District which quickly became the Western Front, under the command of Major General Aleksandr Stepanov. During Operation Barbarossa, the division was attacked by the German 256th and 162nd Infantry Divisions. Its regiments fought separately and retreated eastwards, towards Sokółka. By June 24 the division lost 40% of its soldiers and the following day unsuccessfully tried to defend the Swisłocz river line. In accordance with orders, it defended the line until the end of the day when it was annihilated. Only small groups of soldiers from the division reached Soviet lines in July and early August. The division was officially disbanded on September 19, 1941.

The second formation of the division was recreated August 1941 at Arkhangelsk, (renamed from Rebolsky Direction Division on September 24, 1941) and the division subsequently fought against the Finnish Army. The division was subordinated to the 26th Army of the Karelian Front in May 1942, and was deployed in the far north of Russia until the end of 1944. It was awarded the Order of the Red Banner on 5 April for its actions in the capture of Stolp. The unit completed the war with the 19th Army of the 2nd Belorussian Front in May 1945.

Postwar, the division was stationed in Poland near Gdynia with the Northern Group of Forces and disbanded in the summer of 1945.

References

Citations

Bibliography 

 Vladimir Beshanov, Czerwony Blitzkrieg, .

 Various authors, S.S. Khromov (ed.), "Гражданская война и военная интервенция в СССР" in: Советская Энциклопедия. Moscow, 1983. p. 704
 Grzegorz Łukomski, Bogusław Polak, Mieczysław Wrzosek, Wojna polsko-bolszewicka 1919-1920. Koszalin, 1990

027
027
Military units and formations established in 1918
Military units and formations disestablished in 1945
Military units and formations of the Soviet invasion of Poland